Minuscule 497 (in the Gregory-Aland numbering), ε 1125 (in the Soden numbering), is a Greek minuscule manuscript of the New Testament, on parchment. Palaeographically it has been assigned to the 11th-century. 
Scrivener labelled it by number 583.
The manuscript has marginalia. It has survived in complete condition.

Description 

The codex contains the complete text of the four Gospels on 184 parchment leaves (size ). The text is written in one column per page, 22-23 lines per page, in very small hand.

There is also a division according to the Ammonian Sections, with references to the Eusebian Canons.

It contains the Epistula ad Carpianum, Eusebian tables, prolegomena, subscriptions at the end of each Gospel, and pictures (portrait of John, the Evangelist, and Prochorus, his scribe).

Text 

The Greek text of the codex is a representative of the Byzantine text-type. Aland placed it in Category V.
According to the Claremont Profile Method it belongs to the textual family Kx in Luke 1 and Luke 20. In Luke 10 no profile was made.

History 

It is dated by the INTF to the 11th-century.

The manuscript was added to the list of New Testament manuscripts by Scrivener (583) and C. R. Gregory (497). It was examined by Scrivener and Bloomfield.

It is currently housed at the British Library (Add MS 16943) in London.

See also 

 List of New Testament minuscules
 Biblical manuscript
 Textual criticism

References

Further reading 

 

Greek New Testament minuscules
11th-century biblical manuscripts
British Library additional manuscripts